Provincial elections were held in East Pakistan on 17 December 1970, ten days after general elections. A total of 1,850 candidates ran for the for 300 seats in the East Pakistan Provincial Assembly. The result was a landslide victory for the Awami League, which won 288 of the 300 seats.

Background
In the previous provincial election in 1954, the Awami League, Krishak Sramik Party and other smaller parties formed an alliance called United Front (Jukto Front). The Jukto Front won a landslide victory by winning 223 of the 309 seats. The Muslim League, once the most popular party in the province, had its worst-ever defeat, with many provincial ministers, including the Chief Minister of East Bengal, losing their seats.

In 1958 After military takeover of Field Marshal Ayub Khan all Federal and Provincial Governments of Pakistan were overthrown.

Sheikh Mujibur Rehman became the leader of Awami league in 1963 and became the strongest supporter of lifting up Martial Law and restoring Democracy. In 1965 Presidential Election Sheikh Mujibur Rehman openly supported and launched campaign along with his Party for Fatima Jinnah. Fatima Jinnah gained more votes in East Bengal than West Pakistan.

on 18 March 1966 Sheikh Mujibur Rehman placed Six-point movement during a conference held in Lahore which demanded more autonomy for East Bengal. It was rejected by then political parties of both wings but got huge support from the people of East Bengal. In April 1966 Sheikh Mujibur Rehman demanded to conduct a Nationwide Referendum on his six-point movement and said that Military establishment is exploiting East Bengal by using all export revenue of Jute to feed the Army.

He was arrested in April 1966 in Jessore but was bailed out soon. He was again arrested on the orders of Ayub Khan in May and sent to Sylhet jail where he was charged with Agartala Conspiracy case along with 28 East Bengali Military and Government officials. after huge protests against sheikh Mujib arrest across East Bengal all cases were withdrawn and Sheikh Mujibur Rehman was released.

A month before elections the deadliest tropical storm hit East Bengal which claimed lives of at least half a million people. Poor response from then Government of Pakistan skyrocketed popularity of anti-establishment party Awami League. Military Dictator and then President Yahya Khan was strongly criticized by International Media due to its poor disaster governance.

Results
The Awami League won a landslide victory of 288 seats. After claiming all ten seats reserved for women, it held 298 seats.

Aftermath
After getting a landslide victory and clear mandate. Yahya Khan and People's Party didn't wanted majority from East Bengal rule Pakistan. Bhutto's quoted "udhar tum, idhar hum" (you rule East, we rule West) and threatened PPP Members of Parliament by saying that he will break legs of those who will go to Dhaka to attend National Assembly Session called on March 3, 1971, just because of blocking Sheikh Mujib to become Prime Minister of Pakistan. After National Assembly Session was cancelled by President Yahya Khan on March 1. Sheikh Mujibur Rehman gave a famous Speech on March 7 to a huge crowd at Ramna Course Ground in Dhaka and demanded uplifting of Martial Law, withdrawal of army to their barracks and transfer of power to the elected representatives by the people before 25 March National Assembly Session. On March 26, 1971, Pakistan Military Launched Operation Searchlight against East Bengali people to curb Bengali Nationalist Movement in East Bengal.Sheikh Mujibur Rehman declared Proclamation of Independence of Bangladesh on 26 March 1971. This led to start of 9 month long Bangladesh Liberation War which led to Surrender of Pakistani forces in East Bengal and Independence of Bangladesh.

References

East Pakistan
History of East Pakistan
1970